Dharam Singh ministry was the Council of Ministers in Karnataka, a state in South India headed by Dharam Singh that was formed after the 2004 Karnataka elections.

In the government headed by Dharam Singh, the Chief Minister was from INC while Deputy Chief Minister was from JD(S). Apart from the CM & Deputy CM, there were other ministers in the government.

Tenure of the government 
After the 2004 assembly elections, BJP emerged as the single largest party with 79 seats, followed by the INC with 65 seats and JD(S) with 58 seats. JD(S) extended the support to INC to form the government. Governor T. N. Chaturvedi invited the alliance to form the government. Known for his adaptability and friendly nature, Dharam Singh of the Congress was the unanimous choice of both parties to head the government. He was sworn in as Chief Minister on 28 May 2004 with the support of JD(S). JD(S) MLA Siddaramaiah was sworn in as the Deputy Chief Minister, along with Chief Minister Dharam Singh. On 18 January 2006, Forty-two MLAs of Janata Dal (Secular) under Kumaraswamy's leadership left the coalition and the government collapsed. Chief Minister Dharam Singh was asked to prove majority on 25 January 2006. He resigned since he did not have enough numbers. On 28 January 2006, Karnataka Governor T. N. Chaturvedi invited Kumaraswamy to form the government in the state after the resignation of the Congress Government led by Dharam Singh.

Council of Ministers

Chief Minister and Deputy Chief Minister

Cabinet Ministers

Minister of State

If the office of a Minister is vacant for any length of time, it automatically comes under the charge of the Chief Minister.

See also 

 Karnataka Legislative Assembly

References

External links 

 Council of Ministers 

Cabinets established in 2004
2004 establishments in Karnataka
Dharam Singh
Janata Dal (Secular) ministries
2006 disestablishments in India
Cabinets disestablished in 2006
2004 in Indian politics
Indian National Congress state ministries